The 1955 Southern Illinois Salukis football team was an American football team that represented Southern Illinois University (now known as Southern Illinois University Carbondale) in the Interstate Intercollegiate Athletic Conference (IIAC) during the 1955 college football season.  Under first-year head coach Albert Kawal, the team compiled a 4–4–2 record. The team played its home games at McAndrew Stadium in Carbondale, Illinois.

Schedule

References

Southern Illinois
Southern Illinois Salukis football seasons
Southern Illinois Salukis football